Baatar Khairkhan is a mountain in Mongolia, located in the Khovd Province.

See also
 List of Ultras of Central Asia
 List of mountains in Mongolia

References

External links
 "Baatar Khairkhan, Mongolia" on Peakbagger

Mountains of Mongolia
Altai Mountains
Khovd Province
Three-thousanders